You may be looking for David Galula.

Galula is an administrative ward in Songwe District, Songwe Region, Tanzania. According to the 2002 census, the ward has a total population of 14,005.

Under German occupation, it was known as St. Moritz.

References

Wards of Songwe Region